Visionland is the debut studio album by American rapper YBN Nahmir. The album was released on March 26, 2021, through Atlantic Records and featured guest appearances from 21 Savage, Ty Dolla Sign, G Herbo, G-Eazy, Offset, E-40, Too Short, FatBoy SSE, and DaBoii. The album failed to chart in any territory and reportedly sold 4,000 copies in its first week of release in the United States.

Critical reception 

Dylan Green of Pitchfork gave Visionland a rating of 5.3 out of 10, saying that "[Nahmir]'s missing the punchy enthusiasm of Flo Milli, the melodic sharpness of NoCap, or the vivid stoicism of OMB Peezy and brings little else to the table". He gave positive comments about the album's first track, calling it "one of Nahmir's best".

Fan reception 

When the album was released, fans immediately began to criticize the project for its poor quality, and questionable lyrical content, most notably in the song "Soul Train", which as of October 30, 2021 has 405 thousand dislikes compared to 55 thousand likes on its YouTube lyric video. The song became a meme on TikTok and Twitter due to the overwhelmingly negative reception.

Track listing

References 

2021 albums
Atlantic Records albums